Collège Franco-Libanais Elite or Lycée français international Elite - Tyr is a French international school in Tyre, Lebanon. It is a part of the Association Franco-Libanaise pour l'Education et la Culture (AFLEC) network.

It serves levels toute petite section (fewer than three years) to terminale, the final year of lycée (senior high school/sixth form college).

It first opened in 1996.  66.2% of the students were Lebanese, 16.2% of the students were French, and 17.6% of the students were of other nationalities.

References

External links

 Collège Élite 
 Groupe d’Etablissements Elite (GEE) 

Tyre, Lebanon
French international schools in Lebanon
1996 establishments in Lebanon
Educational institutions established in 1996